The Nederlandsche Dok en Scheepsbouw Maatschappij (NDSM) (Dutch: Netherlands dock and shipbuilding company), was a shipbuilding and repair company based in Amsterdam in the Netherlands, existing from 1946 to 1979. The area of about 80 hectares has since 2013 been transformed into a modern city district as a distinct part of Amsterdam-Noord and is still under development. The industrial wharfs and structures have been replaced by apartment buildings and hospitality industry, still called NDSM.

Foundation

Partnership turned into Public Company 
The company came into existence as a general partnership named Nederlandsche Dok en Scheepsbouw Maatschappij (NDSM), founded by Nederlandsche Scheepsbouw Maatschappij (NSM) and Nederlandsche Dok Maatschappij (NDM) both from Amsterdam. On 27 February 1946 this partnership was confirmed by the shareholders of both companies. The partnership would soon be turned into the public company NDSM NV. All assets would be handed to NDSM, and staff would get a contract with NDSM. The board would be formed by members of the boards of the old public companies. These would continue to exist and remained accountable for any loss, but had no other relevance.

Customers 
Customers of NDSM included Koninklijke Paketvaart-Maatschappij (KPM), Koninklijke Nederlandsche Stoomboot Maatschappij (KNSM), Royal Dutch Shell and the Royal Netherlands Navy.

Warships built

Notes

External links 

 History of NDSM
 

Manufacturing companies based in Amsterdam
Shipbuilding companies of the Netherlands
Defence companies of the Netherlands